901 Fifth Avenue is a  skyscraper in downtown Seattle, Washington. It was completed in 1973 and has 42 floors. It is the 11th tallest building in Seattle, and was designed by John Graham and Associates. The building was opened as the Bank of California Building. Flood lights illuminate all sides of the tower at night. It was renovated in 2007 and achieved LEED Certified Silver status, which is rare for preexisting buildings.

Formerly the Union Bank of California Building, the name was changed to 901 Fifth Avenue following the sale by Beacon Capital Partners to Kennedy Wilson Inc. of Beverly Hills. From its opening in 1973 to July 2007 the building address was 900 Fourth Avenue.

In 2016, the building was purchased by Schnitzer West, developer of the nearby Madison Centre, and Investcorp for $223.3 million. The lobby was renovated in 2017 at a cost of $4.6 million to prepare for another sale. The Vanbarton Group purchased the building for $305 million in 2019. Its largest tenants are Cray and PitchBook Data; at its base on the west side is a Bartell Drugs store.

See also
List of tallest buildings in Seattle

References

Leadership in Energy and Environmental Design basic silver certified buildings
Skyscraper office buildings in Seattle
Office buildings completed in 1973
Downtown Seattle
1973 establishments in Washington (state)